The Teachers Insurance and Annuity Association of America-College Retirement Equities Fund (TIAA, formerly TIAA-CREF), is a Fortune 100 financial services organization that is the leading provider of financial services in the academic, research, medical, cultural and governmental fields. TIAA serves over 5 million active and retired employees participating at more than 15,000 institutions and has $1 trillion in combined assets under management with holdings in more than 50 countries.

Profile
Long organized as a tax-exempt non-profit organization, a 1997 tax bill removed TIAA's tax exemption. It is now organized as a non-profit organization, the TIAA Board of Governors, with taxable subsidiaries; all profits are returned to policyholders.

TIAA bought its Manhattan headquarters building, 730 Third Avenue, in 1955. It has major offices in Denver, Colorado; Charlotte, North Carolina; and Dallas, Texas; as well as 70 local offices throughout the U.S. In 2018, TIAA ranked 84th on Fortune's list of the 500 largest corporations in America. , TIAA is the largest global investor in agriculture, the second-largest grower of wine grapes in the United States (by acreage), and the third-largest commercial real estate manager in the world.

History
In 1918, Andrew Carnegie and his Carnegie Foundation for the Advancement of Teaching, under the leadership of Henry S. Pritchett, created the Teachers Insurance and Annuity Association of America (TIAA), a fully funded system of pensions for professors. Funding was provided by a combination of grants from the foundation and Carnegie Corporation of New York, as well as ongoing contributions from participating institutions and individuals. The policyholders voted in 1921 to implement policyholder representation on the TIAA board so that educators would have a role in running the organization.

CREF 
TIAA's conservative investing helped it survive the 1929 stock market crash and the Great Depression. Albert Einstein became a participant in 1933, which TIAA-CREF advertised in a notable 2001 campaign.

After World War II, in reaction to rising inflation and lengthening life expectancies, and a dramatic expansion of the education sector with the G.I. Bill, TIAA recognized the need for its participants to invest in equities in order to diversify its retirement funds. TIAA created the College Retirement Equities Fund (CREF), a variable annuity, for that purpose, in 1952.

21st century
On June 15, 2007, TIAA became one of the first U.S. companies to voluntarily adopt, and the first to implement, a policyholder advisory vote on executive compensation policy.

On February 22, 2016, TIAA-CREF rebranded as simply TIAA as part of a new marketing and imaging campaign. CMO Connie Weaver explained that the old name was perceived by customers as being complicated, and that the new branding scheme was meant to portray a simpler and friendlier image of the organization.

, TIAA was providing parental leave irrespective of the parent's gender.

Investments and diversification
 2012: bought Festival Place, a shopping center in Basingstoke, England for £280 million.
 2013: purchased a 50% stake in the Grand Canal Shoppes, including the Shoppes at the Palazzo, in Las Vegas, Nevada, for net proceeds of US$410 million as part of a new joint venture with General Growth Properties. GGP will continue to oversee the asset management of the project.
 2014: announced that it would acquire Nuveen Investments in a deal valued at $6.25 billion.
 2016: announced deal to buy EverBank Financial Corp. for $2.5 billion in cash; completed June 12, 2017. The combined bank's legal entity name is TIAA, FSB.

Nearly a year after the acquisition of Everbank, TIAA began rebranding all of its banking activities under the TIAA Bank name on June 4, 2018.

Controversy
On October 17, 2017, The New York Times published a story alleging that TIAA investment advisors had conflicts of interest when it made financial recommendations to clients. That was based on a whistleblower complaint and class action lawsuit, both of which were instigated by former employees.

See also

 TIAA Bank

References

External links 
 tiaa.org, company's official website

 
1918 establishments in New York (state)
Andrew Carnegie
Companies based in Manhattan
Financial services companies based in New York City
Financial services companies established in 1918
Insurance companies based in New York City
Investment management companies of the United States
Non-profit organizations based in New York City
Retirement plans in the United States